Youssef (Elias) was 20th century Bishop of Aleppo in the Greek Orthodox Church of Antioch.

Youssef was born in Tartous, Syria on August 1, 1931. He began his theological education at Balamand Monastery followed by the  Universities of Athens and Thessalonica in Greece. He was elected to the see of Aleppo in 1971 and was consecrated metropolitan by Patriarch Elias (Muawad) IV and Metropolitans Ignatius of Lattakia, Athansios of Hama, Constantine of Bagdad, and Alexis of Homs.

Metropolitan Elias died on August 6, 2000.

References

Greek Orthodox Christians from Syria
Syrian bishops
1931 births
2000 deaths
Bishops of the Greek Orthodox Church of Antioch
People from Tartus
20th-century Eastern Orthodox archbishops
21st-century Eastern Orthodox archbishops
20th-century Syrian people
21st-century Syrian people